Australia Week is a promotion of "all things Australian" held annually in the United States.

History
Pioneered in 2004 as G’Day LA, by the Australian Consul General in Los Angeles, John Olsen, G'DAY USA: Australia Week is now arguably the largest single foreign country promotion held annually in the United States, showcasing all things Australian.

Innovation

The Innovation Day has provided Australian companies visibility, new deals and partnerships with members of the American venture capital and R&D industries. Tasmanian company Autech Software & Design, producers of colour visualisation software, won the inaugural Innovation Shootout in 2007; being selected as Australia's most innovative company by a panel of judges including theWall Street Journal and CEO's of some of America's leading venture capital firms. The company received widespread media coverage both in Australia and overseas, including articles in the New York Post and Wall Street Journal, and the company CEO being interviewed on Chinese television.  Fermiscan, the winner of the 2008 Innovation competition, also received extensive media coverage including Fox Business Network, BusinessWeek Magazine, ABC News NY and CW 11 New York.

The Innovation Day and Financial Services events focus on brokering business connections within the finance and R&D communities, exposing US executives to Australian innovators and financial services leaders. The marquee session of the Innovation Day includes the 'Innovation Shootout' whereby six Australian states compete to have their product/innovation funded and launched in the US marketplace.

Tourism

Qantas bookings rose during Australia Week 2008 to record-breaking levels. As a result of the promotion, in April 2008, Qantas increased its capacity to offer 47 flights between United States and Australia – nearly doubling capacity over the last five years since the promotion began.

Australia-Week.com and Australia.com received almost 150,000 visits, with visitors spending 17,500 hours learning about Australia.

Media coverage

Australia Week 2008 media coverage generated 445 million global audience impressions—an equivalent advertising buy of approximately $7.5 million.

The Black Tie Galas in Los Angeles and New York serve as the publicity anchors of G’DAY USA: Australia Week. The dinners honor high-profile individuals for significant contributions in their industries and for excellence in promoting Australia in the United States. Previous honorees include: Cate Blanchett, Anthony LaPaglia, Mel Gibson, Nicole Kidman, Keith Urban, Olivia Newton-John, Naomi Watts, Russell Crowe, INXS, Kylie Minogue, Phillip Noyce and Colette Dinnigan.

In 2011, The Black Tie Gala signature event honoured legendary Australian singer Barry Gibb, tennis champion Roy Emerson and acclaimed actress Abbie Cornish. Olivia Newton-John presented to Barry Gibb, Andre Agassi presented to Roy Emerson and Director Zack Snyder presented to Abbie Cornish. The evening featured Australian food prepared by celebrity chefs Curtis Stone and Wolfgang Puck. Entertainment included performances by Guy Sebastian, The Qantas Choir and a fashion show presented by Myer.

See also
 Tourism Australia
 Tourism in Australia
 Australia–United States relations

References

Tourism in Australia
Recurring events established in 2004
Awareness weeks
Observances in Australia
Australian American
Australian diaspora
Observances in the United States
Week-long observances